Michael Orest Hayvoronsky (Mykhailo Orest Haivoronsky) (September 15, 1892 – September 11, 1949) was a Ukrainian composer, musician, conductor, teacher, violinist, and critic.

Biography

Ukraine 
Michael Hayvoronsky was born on September 15 (O.S. September 1), 1892 in Zalischyky, in the Podilia region. After graduating from the Zalischyky seminary in 1912, he went to study in the Mykola Lysenko music institute in Lviv. At the beginning of World War I there was a nationalistic independence movement of Halych, which Hayvoronsky took part. He was the organizer, conductor, and inspector of many orchestras. In the early 1920s Michael took an active part in musical life. He taught at the Mykola Lysenko music institute in Lviv, was a teacher of music at a girl's gymnasium, and conducted the combined choirs: Boyan and Bandurist.

United States 
In 1923, M. Hayvoronsky moved to the United States, to New York City. There he founded a Music Conservatory in 1924 and lectured at the Columbia University. Later, he organized a Ukrainian Instrumental Orchestra, which he directed until 1936. Hayvoronsky also organized and conducted a combined choir with singers from seven church choirs, with whom he had big concerts of his own works from 1932 to 1936. From the second half of the 1930s and on, the composer focused more on composing music, and supporting Ukrainian youth in America.  Hayvoronsky died on September 11, 1949 in New York and is buried there.

Works 
Michael Hayvoronsky's most famous songs include over 30 rifleman's (striletski) songs (some based on his own poems), the Dovbush Rhapsody, overtures, and dances and marches for wind orchestra.

America 
In America, significant works composed by Hayvoronsky include:
the Symphonic Allegro
the waltz Chervona Kalyna
quartets for violin trio:
Morozenko
Christmas Suite
Kolomiyka
violin pieces:
Eulogy
Kolyskova
Song without words
Serenade
Sonatina

Choir 
M. Hayvoronsky also made the choir collections:
Carols and shchedrivkas
The Hutsul Christmas
two Liturgies
two Izhe Kheruvym

Theatre 
His most famous theatre works:
Viy
Dovbush
Hetman Doroshenko

External links 
Info on Pisni.org 
Library for Youth Article on Haivoronsky 
Example of Striletsky song Words and music by Haivoronsky

Sources 
Wytwycky W. Michael O. hayvoronsky - Life and work NY, 1954

Ukrainian composers
1892 births
1949 deaths
Ukrainian music educators
20th-century composers
People from Zalishchyky